Pistyll Rhaeadr (meaning "spring of the waterfall") is a waterfall  from the village of Llanrhaeadr-ym-Mochnant in Powys, Wales, and  west of Oswestry.

Description 
Pistyll Rhaeadr is formed by the Afon Disgynfa falling, in three stages, over a  Silurian cliff-face, below which the river is known as the Afon Rhaeadr. The tallest stage is estimated at about 40 metres. It is counted as one of the Seven Wonders of Wales and is a Site of Special Scientific Interest. The 19th-century author George Borrow, in his book Wild Wales, remarked of the waterfall: "What shall I liken it to? I scarcely know, unless it is to an immense skein of silk agitated and disturbed by tempestuous blasts, or to the long tail of a grey courser at furious speed. I never saw water falling so gracefully, so much like thin, beautiful threads as here."

There is car parking space near the foot of the waterfall for people who want to explore the waterfall, with a café and a B&B alongside.

The waterfall is often referred to by the media, government sources, and other sources as the tallest in Wales or the tallest single drop in the United Kingdom. However, it is not a single drop, and both its single drop height and its total height are surpassed by both the Devil's Appendix and Pistyll y Llyn, as well as several other waterfalls.

See also
 List of waterfalls of the United Kingdom

References

External links 

 www.pistyllrhaeadr.co.uk
 BBC NE Wales Seven Wonders of Wales
 Photos of Pistyll Rhaeadr on geograph

Sites of Special Scientific Interest in Clwyd
Landmarks in Wales
Tourist attractions in Powys
Waterfalls of Powys
Natural arches of Wales
WRhaeadr